Jeannot Fernand (born November 22, 1961 in Ambato-Boeni) is a Malagasy politician.  He is a member of the Senate of Madagascar for Betsiboka, and is a member of the Tiako I Madagasikara party.

References

1961 births
Living people
Members of the Senate (Madagascar)
Tiako I Madagasikara politicians